A referendum on the Compact of Free Association was held in Palau on 10 February 1983. Voters were asked three questions:
Whether they approved of the Compact of Free Association between Palau and the United States
Whether they approved of an agreement which placed restrictions on the USA with regard to storing and using radioactive, chemical and biological materials in Palau
What their preference for a future political status was if the Free Association (question one) was rejected. They were offered the choice of either "a relationship with the United States closer than Free Association" or independence.

The first two propositions were both approved, nullifying the need for the results of the third. Voter turnout was 78.5%.

Results

Question 1

Question 2

Question 3

References

Palau
1983 in Palau
Referendums in Palau
Palau